Reservoir Park may refer to:

Asia
Lower Peirce Reservoir Park in Singapore
Upper Peirce Reservoir Park in Singapore
Wong Nai Chung Reservoir Park in Hong Kong

Oceania
Greenvale Reservoir Park in Melbourne, Victoria
Reservoir Park, Adelaide Park Lands in Adelaide, South Australia

United States
Pleasant Grove Reservoir Park in Plant City, Florida
Reservoir Park (Massachusetts) in Brookline (Boston)
Reservoir Park (Pennsylvania) in Harrisburg
Reservoir State Park in Lewiston, New York